The fourth Morgan government (19 July 2007 – 10 December 2009) was a Labour–Plaid Cymru coalition government led by First Minister for Wales, Rhodri Morgan.

After the collapse of coalition talks between Plaid Cymru, the Conservative Party and the Liberal Democrats, the Labour Party started talks with Plaid Cymru, reaching the "One Wales" agreement. A new cabinet was appointed on 19 July 2007.

Cabinet

Junior ministers

See also 
Members of the 3rd National Assembly for Wales

References

Welsh governments
Ministries of Elizabeth II
Coalition governments of the United Kingdom
2007 establishments in Wales
2009 disestablishments in Wales
Cabinets established in 2007
Cabinets disestablished in 2009